The 2018 Premier Volleyball League Collegiate Conference is the 5th conference of the Premier Volleyball League (32nd conference of the former Shakey's V-League). Conference started on July 21, 2018 and ended on September 12, 2018 at the Filoil Flying V Centre, San Juan, Metro Manila.

Women's division

Participating teams

Line-up

Preliminary round

|}

Point system:
3 points = win match in 3 or 4 sets
2 points = win match in 5 sets
1 point  = lose match in 5 sets
0 point  = lose match in 3 or 4 sets

Match results
 All times are in Philippines Standard Time (UTC+08:00)

|}

Final round

 All series are best-of-three.

Semifinals
Rank 1 vs Rank 4

|}
Rank 2 vs Rank 3

|}

Finals
3rd place

|}
Championship

|}

Awards

Final standings

Medalists

Men's division

Participating teams

Line-up

Preliminary round

|}

Point system:
3 points = win match in 3 or 4 sets
2 points = win match in 5 sets
1 point  = lose match in 5 sets
0 point  = lose match in 3 or 4 sets

Match results
 All times are in Philippines Standard Time (UTC+08:00)

|}

Fourth–seed play-offs

|}

Final round

 All series are best-of-three.

Semifinals
Rank 1 vs Rank 4

|}
Rank 2 vs Rank 3

|}

Finals
3rd place

|}
Championship

|}

Awards

Final standings

References

Premier Volleyball League (Philippines)
2018 in Philippine sport